Atlantic Motorsport Park (AMP) is an all-purpose motorsports facility located near Shubenacadie, Nova Scotia. The 11-turn road course was opened in  August, 1974, and is situated on a  site.

History
One of the most unusual things about AMP is that it was designed, built and operated since August, 1974 by a volunteer group of motorsport enthusiasts, from the automobile, snowmobile and motorcycle racing groups. It has also hosted a Country and Western Festival, as well as a highly controversial rock concert. It remains completely owned by its member clubs and is believed to be the only track in North America that hosts a national series competition that is volunteer run.

AMP has hosted notable auto racing categories, including Formula Atlantic and a NASCAR race in the 1970s. The official lap record of 60.00 seconds was set in a Formula Atlantic Event in 1975 by Canadian racing legend Gilles Villeneuve. The circuit also featured the Canadian Honda Civic challenge in the 1980s.

At present, AMP is the annual host to the penultimate round of the Mopar Canadian Superbike Championship.

From May through October the track is busy with several local motorcycle and car clubs activities. The Atlantic Roadracing League  runs a full schedule of motorcycle racing. The Atlantic Region Motor Sports Club (ARMS) uses it for their sedan and formula racing schedules. The Atlantic Sports Car Club (ASCC) uses it for their SoloSprint events.
There are also a number of Advanced Performance Driving and Race Schools throughout the season.

CASC Atlantic Championship

Atlantic Motorsport Park hosted the CASC Player's Challenge Series (Atlantic Championship) from 1974 to 1977 and again in 1979.

See also
 List of auto racing tracks in Canada

References

External links

Canadian Superbike Championship - Official Site

Motorsport in Canada
Motorsport venues in Nova Scotia
Road racing venues in Canada
Buildings and structures in Hants County, Nova Scotia
Tourist attractions in Hants County, Nova Scotia